Maximiliano Pablo Cuberas Escalas (born 16 August 1973 in Villada, Santa Fe), known as Maximiliano Cuberas, is an Argentine football defender who retired playing for Ferro Carril Oeste.

External links
 Maximiliano Cuberas – Argentine Primera Statistics at Fútbol XXI 
 
 
 Nuevo Cementerio profile 

People from Caseros Department
Sportspeople from Santa Fe Province
Argentine footballers
Argentine expatriate footballers
Association football defenders
Rosario Central footballers
Club Atlético Colón footballers
Club Atlético Lanús footballers
Ferro Carril Oeste footballers
Deportivo Toluca F.C. players
Argentine Primera División players
Liga MX players
Expatriate footballers in Mexico
1973 births
Living people